Katreus drucei is a species of butterfly in the family Hesperiidae. It is found in Cameroon. The habitat consists of forests.

References

Endemic fauna of Cameroon
Butterflies described in 2002
Hesperiidae